Wild Beast may refer to:

 Wild Beast (roller coaster), a wooden roller coaster at Canada's Wonderland, Vaughan, Ontario, Canada
 Wild Beast (novel), a 1991 novel by Wang Shuo

See also
 Wildebeest, a bovidae native of Africa
 Wildlife, undomesticated organisms that grow or live wild in an area without being introduced by humans